The 2012 Kashima Antlers season is Kashima Antlers's 20th season in J.League Division 1 and 24th overall in the Japanese top flight. Kashima Antlers are also competing in the 2012 Emperor's Cup and 2012 J.League Cup.

Players

Competitions

J.League

League table

Matches

J.League Cup

Emperor's Cup

References

Kashima Antlers
Kashima Antlers seasons